Tabac may refer to:

 the French word for Tobacco
 Tabac (perfume), a cologne that was created by Mäurer & Wirtz in 1959
 Tabac (store), a store licensed to sell tobacco products in France
 the Tabac corner at the Circuit de Monaco, the venue for the Monaco Grand Prix

People with the surname
Yoni Tabac (born 1980), Israeli actor